After nine years of absence, the thirteenth edition of the Caribbean Series (Serie del Caribe) was revived in 1970 without the representing baseball clubs of Cuba and Panama. It was held in Caracas, Venezuela from February 5 to February 10 at Estadio Universitario, featuring the original members of the first stage. Puerto Rico was represented by the Leones de Ponce, while the host Navegantes del Magallanes represented Venezuela. The Dominican Republic debuted in the Series and was represented by the Tigres del Licey to complete a three-team tournament. The format consisted of 12 games, with each team facing the other competitors three times. Because the series was so small, each team had to face each other in one night.

Summary
For the first time, Venezuela captured the competition with a record of 7-1 behind strong pitching performances by Orlando Peña (2-0, 2.00 ERA in 18.0 innings pitched), Aurelio Monteagudo (2-0, one shutout, 16 SO, 0.00 in 12 2⁄3 IP), Jay Ritchie (no hit no run, nine-SO shutout), and Larry Jaster (1-0, 3.30 ERA in 16 1⁄3 IP). With Carlos Pascual as manager, 1B Gonzalo Márquez was voted Most Valuable Player after leading Series hitters with a .478 batting average (11-for-25). Other contributions came from  2B Gustavo Gil (.387, four runs, seven RBI),  CF César Tovar (.349, five runs, three stolen bases), C Ray Fosse (.391, four runs), and 3B Dámaso Blanco (five runs, five RBI). Also in the roster were infielder Chico Ruiz, outfielder Jim Holt, and pitchers Don Eddy, Mike Hedlund and Luis Peñalver.

The team of Puerto Rico, with Jim Fregosi at the helm, finished second with a 4-4 mark. The pitching staff was led by Wayne Simpson, who went 2-0 with a 1.12 ERA and two complete games, including a four-hit shutout. Also in the roster were pitchers Mike Cuellar, Paul Doyle and Clyde Wright; catcher Pat Corrales; infielders José Cruz (1B), Sandy Alomar Sr. (2B), Tony Pérez (3B) and Jackie Hernández (SS), and outfielders Julio Roque (LF), Luis Meléndez (CF) and Bernie Carbo (RF). Meléndez led the Puerto Rican offensive with one home run, six runs and six RBI.

Dominican Republic, led by outfielder/manager Manny Mota, ended in last place with a 1-7 record. The team's only victory came behind a strong pitching effort from Reggie Cleveland, who threw nine innings of one-hit, one run ball against Puerto Rico. The team featured players as Matty Alou, Rico Carty, César Cedeño, Elvio Jiménez and Freddie Velázquez.

Final standings

Individual leaders

All-Star team

Scoreboards

Game 1, February 5

Game 2, February 5

Game 3, February 6

Game 4, February 6

Game 5, February 7

Game 6, February 7

Game 7, February 8

Game 8, February 8

Game 9, February 9

Game 10, February 9

Game 11, February 10

Game 12, February 10

See also
Ballplayers who have played in the Series

Sources
Antero Núñez, José. Series del Caribe. Jefferson, Caracas, Venezuela: Impresos Urbina, C.A., 1987.
Gutiérrez, Daniel. Enciclopedia del Béisbol en Venezuela – 1895-2006 . Caracas, Venezuela: Impresión Arte, C.A., 2007.

External links
Official site
Latino Baseball
Series del Caribe, Las (Spanish)
 
  
  

Caribbean
Caribbean Series
International baseball competitions hosted by Venezuela
Sport in Caracas
1970 in Caribbean sport
1970 in Venezuelan sport
Caribbean Series
20th century in Caracas